(see ) is a command-line utility initially written for use with the Solaris 7 operating system in 1998. It has since been reimplemented for Linux and some BSDs.

The  command allows the use of extended regular expression patterns and other matching criteria.

Example usage
Kill the most recently created  process:
pkill -n acroread

Send a USR1 signal to  process:
pkill -USR1 acroread

See also

Some other unix commands related to process management and killing include:

 , which sends signals processes by process ID instead of by pattern-matching against the name.
 , which changes the priority of a process.
 , a command-line utility to send signals or report process status.  is favoured over it.

References

External links
 Oracle: Man pages pgrep, pkill
 Oracle: How to terminate a process (pkill)

Unix process- and task-management-related software